Ludovic Baal (born 24 May 1986) is a French Guianan professional footballer who plays as a left-back for the French Guiana national team.

Club career
Baal moved from Le Mans to Lens on 10 June 2011. On 12 June 2015, he joined Rennes on a three-year contract. On 1 August 2019, Baal joined Brest. On 14 January 2022, he signed for Concarneau.

Career statistics

Club

International goals
Scores and results list French Guiana's goal tally first.

References

External links

Profile at L'Équipe 

1986 births
Living people
French people of French Guianan descent
French footballers
French Guianan footballers
Association football fullbacks
Le Mans FC players
RC Lens players
Stade Rennais F.C. players
Stade Brestois 29 players
US Concarneau players
Ligue 1 players
Ligue 2 players
Championnat National 3 players
Championnat National 2 players
French Guiana international footballers
2017 CONCACAF Gold Cup players
Sportspeople from Cayenne